Beloit is a city in Rock County, Wisconsin, United States. As of the 2020 census, the city had a population of 36,657 people. Beloit is a principal city of the Janesville-Beloit Metropolitan Statistical Area and is included in the Madison Combined Statistical Area.

History 
Twelve men in Colebrook, New Hampshire, created the "New England Emigrating Company" in October 1836 and sent Horace White to find a suitable region of Wisconsin in which to settle. The level fields and the water power of Turtle Creek and "unlimited gravel" in the area around what is now Beloit fixed the site of the village and farms. White purchased the land. At the same time as the Colebrook settlers, six families from Bedford, New Hampshire, arrived and settled in the region. They said the Rock River Valley had a "New England look" that made them feel at home. The village was platted in 1838 and was planned with wide streets, building on the New England model.

Beloit was originally named New Albany (after Albany, Vermont) in 1837 by its founder, Caleb Blodgett. The name was changed to Beloit in 1838. The name was coined to be reminiscent of Detroit.
 
Beloit lays claim to such inventions as the speedometer, John Francis Appleby's twine binder, and Korn Kurls, which resemble Cheetos, was the original puffed cheese snack.

Historic buildings 
Beloit's 1889 Water Tower Place began demolition in 1935, which was halted because of the cost. A historic pump station is nearby.

The Fairbanks Flats were built in 1917 to house the rush of African Americans moving to the area from the Southern United States.

Pearsons Hall of Science was designed by the architectural firm Burnham and Root for Beloit College as a science center.

The Lathrop-Munn Cobblestone House was originally built for politician John Hackett.

The Castle at 501 Prospect was built as First Presbyterian Church in 1902. It now operates as a Performing Arts Center and Music School.

Downtown Beloit and the riverfront
Downtown Beloit is the city's historic economic, cultural and social center. North of the confluence of the Rock River and Turtle Creek, the downtown is anchored by a core of historic buildings and the Ironworks office and industrial campus. Beloit's riverfront park system, mainly Riverside Park, extends north of downtown along the east bank toward the Town of Beloit.

Downtown Beloit is one of two inaugural members of the Wisconsin Main Street designation.

Railroad heritage 
Beloit was served by the Chicago, Milwaukee, St. Paul and Pacific Railroad, better known as the Milwaukee Road, and the Chicago & North Western Railroad (C&NW). In its 1980 bankruptcy, the Milwaukee Road disposed of the Southwestern Line. The Union Pacific Railroad, which took over the C&NW, operates in Beloit today over a remnant of the former Milwaukee Road, providing a rail connection to Fairbanks-Morse Engine manufacturing facility. The Canadian Pacific Railway operates other trackage in Beloit. The city also had an electric interurban railroad.

Geography 
Location: .

The city is adjacent to the Town of Beloit, Town of Turtle, and the Illinois municipality of South Beloit.

Most of Beloit's development is occurring on the east side, adjacent to Interstates 39/90 and Interstate 43, where the city annexed rural land for Beloit Gateway Industrial Park, as well as in the newly revitalized downtown along the Rock River.

Climate

Demographics

2020 census
As of the census of 2020, the population was 36,657. The racial makeup of the city was 60.0% White, 14.5% Black or African American, 1.6% Asian, 1.0% Native American, 0.1% Pacific Islander, 11.4% from other races, and 11.3% from two or more races. Ethnically, the population was 21.3% Hispanic or Latino of any race.

2010 census 
As of the census of 2010, there were 36,966 people, 13,781 households, and 8,867 families residing in the city. The racial makeup of the city was 68.9% White, 15.1% African American, 0.4% Native American, 1.1% Asian, 10.0% from other races, and 4.4% from two or more races. Hispanic or Latino of any race were 17.1% of the population.

There were 13,781 households, of which 36.5% had children under the age of 18 living with them, 39.6% were married couples living together, 18.3% had a female householder with no husband present, 6.4% had a male householder with no wife present, and 35.7% were non-families. 29.4% of all households were made up of individuals, and 11.2% had someone living alone who was 65 years of age or older. The average household size was 2.57 and the average family size was 3.16.

The median age in the city was 33.1 years. 27.1% of residents were under the age of 18; 12.1% were between the ages of 18 and 24; 25.7% were from 25 to 44; 23.1% were from 45 to 64; 12% were 65 years of age or older. The gender makeup of the city was 47.9% male and 52.1% female.

Government 
Beloit is represented by Janis Ringhand and Stephen Nass in the Wisconsin State Senate, Amy Loudenbeck and Mark Spreitzer in the Wisconsin State Assembly, Mark Pocan in the United States House of Representatives, and Ron Johnson and Tammy Baldwin in the United States Senate.

Beloit has a council-manager system of government, with seven council members, each elected for two-year terms. Four members are elected in even years and three in odd years. City council elections are held annually in April. The city council establishes policies for the city and appoints a city manager to implement those policies. The current interim city manager, Elizabeth Krueger, was appointed on June 20, 2022.

Economy 
Industries with headquarters in Beloit include ABC Supply Company, Bio-Systems International, Broaster Company, Fairbanks-Morse Defense, Hendricks Holding Company, Murmac Paint Manufacturing, PlayMonster, and Regal Beloit.

Downtown Beloit is a dense cluster of mostly small shops and boutiques. The area has been recognized for increased investment and renewal since the 1990s. Upscale downtown condominiums and hotels were introduced after 2000 with the construction of the Hotel Hilton Apartments (2001), the Beloit Inn (now the Ironworks Hotel, 2003), Heritage View (2005), Phoenix Project (2013), Hotel Goodwin (2018), and the Wright & Wagner Lofts (2021).

From the 1990s to 2011, downtown Beloit received direct public and private investment totaling more than $75 million. In 2011, Beloit was a Great American Main Street Award winner. In 2012, Beloit was listed #17 on Travel and Leisure'''s list of America's Greatest Mainstreets.

 Education 
The School District of Beloit serves 5,923 students in six primary schools, four intermediate schools, and one high school, with alternative programming and charter schools. Beloit Memorial High School is the city's public high school. The Roy Chapman Andrews Academy, a project-based charter school, is part of the School District of Beloit and serves grades 6 through 12.

Beloit College, a private liberal arts college with undergraduate enrollment around 1,300, is in the city, with the main campus adjacent to downtown. The campus has a number of prehistoric Native American mounds.

Blackhawk Technical College, a public technical school, has a campus in downtown Beloit.

Beloit is also home to Concordia University's Beloit location, Beloit Center. The center offers courses designed for working adults interested in getting their associate's, bachelor's, and graduate degrees.

Beloit has a public library that is part of the Arrowhead Library System.

 Media 

Beloit's main newspaper is The Beloit Daily News, a daily (published Monday through Friday) paper owned by Adams Publishing Group, LLC, and serving the Wisconsin/Illinois stateline area. The Janesville Gazette, also owned by Adams Publishing Group, also serves Beloit.

Beloit is a part of the Madison television market, but due to its proximity to Rockford, stations from Rockford also serve the city and report on stories and information (weather, school closings, etc.) relating to Beloit.

Radio stations serving Beloit include WBCR (90.3 FM), a variety-formatted station owned by The Board of Trustees of Beloit College, '90s hits station WBEL (1380 AM), classic country station WGEZ (1490 AM), Janesville-based stations WCLO (1230 AM) and WJVL (99.9 FM), and Fort Atkinson-based WSJY (107.3 FM).

 Culture 
 Beloit Art Center
 Beloit Civic Theatre
 Beloit Historical Society
 Beloit Janesville Symphony Orchestra
 The Castle Performing Arts Center
 Logan Museum of Anthropology
 Turtle Creek Chamber Orchestra
 Wright Museum of Art
Beloit City Hall – this houses a mural portraying the history of Beloit, completed in 1985 by artist Martha Nessler Hayden.

 Festivals 
Beloit's main festivals include:

 Beloit Autorama
 Beloit Farmers' Market
 Beloit International Film Festival
 Dancing at Harry's Place
 Downtown Beloit Street Dance
 Fridays in the Park
 Music at Harry's Place
 Winterfest

 Recreation 

Beloit is home to a professional minor league baseball team, the Beloit Sky Carp, who play in the High-A Central and are the High A affiliate of the Miami Marlins. The Sky Carp play their games at ABC Supply Stadium. Until August 3, 2021, they played at Harry C. Pohlman Field.

 Transportation 

 Transit 
The Beloit Transit System is the primary provider of mass transportation. Four regular routes provide service from Monday through Saturday. In collaboration with the Janesville Transit System, BTS operates an express route between the two cities.

 Routes 
Red East Side Cranston
Blue West Side
Yellow North End-Prairie
Brown Beloit-Janesville

 Roads 

 Air 
Beloit Airport is a small public-use GA airport within the city. It offers hangars for storing aircraft, gliders, and sky diving.

Southern Wisconsin Regional Airport is a public airport north of Beloit in Rock County. Formerly known as Rock County Airport, it is owned and operated by the Rock County government. The airport has no scheduled commercial passenger service.

Dane County Regional Airport and Rockford International Airport are the closest airports to Beloit that offer scheduled airline service.

 Notable people 

 Thomas Ryum Amlie, U.S. Representative
 Marcia Anderson, U. S. Army Major General
 Roy Chapman Andrews, adventurer and naturalist
 Fred Ascani, U.S. Air Force Major General
 Alan E. Ashcraft, Jr., Illinois State Representative
 Clinton Babbitt, U.S. Representative
 George B. Belting, Wisconsin State Representative
 Jim Breton, MLB player
 Jason W. Briggs, leader in development of Reorganized Church of Jesus Christ of Latter Day Saints
 James A. Brittan, Wisconsin State Representative
 Tony Brizzolara, MLB player
 Richard Burdge, Wisconsin State Senator
 Jackson J. Bushnell, educator
 Jim Caldwell, Beloit Memorial High School alumnus, former head coach of NFL's Detroit Lions
 Thomas Chrowder Chamberlin, geologist
 Franklin Clarke, professional football player for Dallas Cowboys (1960–1967) and Cleveland Browns (1957–1959)
 Lawrence E. Cunningham, Wisconsin State Senator
 Horatio N. Davis, Wisconsin State Senator
 Delmar DeLong, Wisconsin State Representative
 Burger M. Engebretson, Wisconsin State Representative
 John E. Erickson, NBA executive
 Betty Everett, rock and jazz singer ("The Shoop Shoop Song")
 Edward A. Everett, Wisconsin State Representative
 Dorr Felt, inventor of comptometer
 Edwin G. Fifield, Wisconsin State Representative
 Bill Flannigan, NFL player
 Patsy Gharrity, MLB player
 Danny Gokey, American Idol contestant, choir director at a Beloit church
 Bernie Graham, professional baseball player
 John Hackett, businessman and politician
 Jim Hall, professional boxer
 Edward F. Hansen, Wisconsin State Representative
 William O. Hansen, Wisconsin State Representative
 Bill Hanzlik, NBA player and coach
 Jonathan Harr, journalist and author of A Civil Action Ken Hendricks, founder of ABC Supply, listed on the Forbes 400
 William H. Hurlbut, Wisconsin State Representative
 Gary Johnson, elected majority leader of Wisconsin Assembly in 1980 and 1983
 Jerry Kenney, baseball player for New York Yankees (1967, 1969–1972) and Cleveland Indians (1973)
 John Baxter Kinne, Medal of Honor recipient
 Stephanie Klett, television personality, Miss Wisconsin 1992
 Gene Knutson, NFL player
 Richard LaPiere, sociologist at Stanford University
 Eugene Lee, Tony Award-winning set designer (Wicked, Saturday Night Live'')
 Wallace Leschinsky, Wisconsin State Representative
 Alonzo J. Mathison, Wisconsin State Representative
 Max Maxfield, Wyoming Secretary of State
 Juan Conway McNabb (John Conway McNabb), Roman Catholic bishop, missionary in Peru
 Dr. Edward Strong Merrill, Wisconsin Athletic Hall of Fame, multi-sport athlete, Beloit College, '02
 Sereno Merrill, Wisconsin State Representative
 Elmer Miller, MLB player
 Tommy Mills, head coach of Creighton Bluejays, Georgetown Hoyas and Arkansas State Indians football teams; Creighton and Arkansas State men's basketball, Notre Dame Fighting Irish baseball
 Orsen N. Nielsen, U.S. diplomat
 David Noggle, Wisconsin State Representative, Chief Justice of Supreme Court of Idaho Territory
 Russ Oltz, NFL player
 Terell Parks, professional basketball player
 Danica Patrick, Indy Car & NASCAR auto racing driver and model
 George Perring, MLB player
 Samuel L. Plummer, Wisconsin State Representative
 Alan S. Robertson, Wisconsin State Representative
 Robert P. Robinson, Wisconsin State Senator
 Judy Robson, former majority leader, Wisconsin Senate
 David Roth, opera director
 Jane Sherman, actress, writer, composer, dancer with The Rockettes
 Richard Shoemaker, Wisconsin State Senator
 Tracy Silverman, violinist
 Mark Simonson, font designer
 Erastus G. Smith, Wisconsin State Representative
 Simon Smith, Wisconsin State Representative
 Robert C. Strong, U.S. diplomat
 William Barstow Strong, former president of Atchison, Topeka and Santa Fe Railway
 Tyree Talton, NFL player
 Rusty Tillman, NFL player and assistant coach, XFL head coach
 S. J. Todd, Wisconsin State Senator
 Marijuana Pepsi Vandyck, education professional
 Allen F. Warden, Wisconsin State Representative
 Arthur Pratt Warner, aviator and inventor
 Kyle Weaver, professional basketball player for Oklahoma City Thunder
 Floyd E. Wheeler, Wisconsin State Representative and lawyer
 John D. Wickhem, Justice of Wisconsin Supreme Court
 Albert J. Winegar, Wisconsin State Representative
 Zip Zabel, MLB player
 Robin Zander, musician (Cheap Trick)

Images

See also 
Thompson Observatory

References

External links 

City of Beloit
Greater Beloit Chamber of Commerce
Visit Beloit

 
1836 establishments in Wisconsin Territory
Cities in Wisconsin
Cities in Rock County, Wisconsin
Populated places established in 1836